Cleveland Clinic Abu Dhabi (كليفلاند كلينك أبو ظبي, known as CCAD) is a multi specialty hospital located in Abu Dhabi, United Arab Emirates. The 364 bed luxury hospital, part of Cleveland Clinic Foundation, USA, has been open to the public since May 2015.

History
Cleveland Clinic Abu Dhabi is the result of a partnership agreement signed in 2006 between Mubadala Development Company and Cleveland Clinic.

The hospital was officially inaugurated on December 3, 2015 by Crown Prince of Abu Dhabi and Deputy Supreme Commander of the Armed Forces Sheikh Mohammed bin Zayed Al Nahyan.

Construction of the project began with Mubadala Development Company appointing Aldar Properties in 2007 as the project's development manager, to oversee the design, construction and commissioning of the hospital. The building was designed by HDR, with Aedas serving as project architects and constructed by partners Six Construct (which owns 60% of the joint venture), a subsidiary of BESIX Group, and South Korean firm Samsung C&T Corporation (40%), the same team which built the world's tallest tower Burj Khalifa. The hospital was initially scheduled to begin full-service operations to patients by the fourth quarter of 2013. Construction was delayed for another 18 months prior to opening its facility to the public in May 2015 due to logistic challenges faced by the massive size of the project. The building is currently the largest structural steel building in the UAE, weighing more than 30,000 tonnes.

On 16 October 2019, an opera singer and recovering stroke patient who had previously received life-saving treatment at the hospital, performed a lunchtime performance for visitors and staff at CCAD.

Facilities

Cleveland Clinic Abu Dhabi is a 23-acre facility with five clinical floors, three diagnostic and treatment levels and 13 floors of critical and acute inpatient units. The 409,234 square metre hospital currently has 364 patient beds, with the option to increase that level to 490, including 72 ICU beds, 4 post anesthesia care units (PACU) and 26 operating rooms. Having 340 doctors and 2,918 nurses and other workers, the hospital currently has more than 50 medical and surgical specialities and is designed to operate five different specialist centres of excellence covering digestive disease, eye, heart and vascular disorders, neurological treatment, and respiratory and critical care. There were more than 5,000 physicians from all around the world who had applied for the initial 175 doctor positions in the hospital. Those who were hired had to complete 40 interviews for the job - 20 in the US and another 20 in Abu Dhabi. Eighty percent of the successful applicants are US-trained, and the rest were trained in western Europe.

See also
List of hospitals in the United Arab Emirates

References

2015 establishments in the United Arab Emirates

Hospital buildings completed in 2013
Hospitals in the United Arab Emirates
Hospitals established in 2015
Cleveland Clinic